The 2012 Segunda División B play-offs (Playoffs de Ascenso or Promoción de Ascenso) were the final playoffs for promotion from 2011–12 Segunda División B to the 2012–13 Segunda División. The four first placed teams in each of the four Segunda División B groups played the Playoffs de Ascenso and the four last placed teams in Segunda División were relegated to Segunda División B. It also decided the two teams which placed 16th to be relegated to the 2012–13 Tercera División.

Group Winners promotion play-off

Qualified teams 
The draw was held in the RFEF headquarters, in Las Rozas (Madrid), on 14 May 2012, 16:30 CEST.

Matches

Semifinals

|}
The aggregate winners were promoted and qualified to the 2011–12 Segunda División B Final. The aggregate losers were relegated to the Non-champions promotion play-off Second Round.

First leg

Second leg

Final

|}

First leg

Second leg

Non-champions promotion play-off

First round

Qualified teams
The draw took place in the RFEF headquarters, in Las Rozas (Madrid), on 14 May 2012, 16:30 CEST.

Matches

|}

First leg

Second leg

Second round

Qualified teams
The draw was held in the RFEF headquarters, in Las Rozas (Madrid), on 28 May 2012, 17:00 CEST.

Matches

|}

First leg

Second leg

Third round

Qualified teams
The draw was held in the RFEF headquarters, in Las Rozas (Madrid), on 11 June 2012, 17:00 CEST.

Matches

|}

First leg

Second leg

Relegation play-off

Qualified teams
The draw was held in the RFEF headquarters, in Las Rozas (Madrid), on 14 May 2012, 16:30 CEST.

Matches

|}

First leg

Second leg

See also 
 2011–12 Segunda División B
 2012 Tercera División play-offs
 2012–13 Segunda División B

References

External links 
Futbolme.com

Segunda División B play-offs
2012 Spanish football leagues play-offs
2011–12 Segunda División B